GMT, or Greenwich Mean Time is the mean solar time at the Royal Observatory in Greenwich, London.

GMT may also refer to:

Science and technology 
 Generic Mapping Tools in graphical computing
 Geometric measure theory
 Giant Magellan Telescope, a telescope under construction in Chile
 GM GMT platform, an automobile platform
 Great Melbourne Telescope, built in Dublin, Ireland

Transport 
 GATX, an American rolling stock leaser
 Granite Mountain Air Station, an airport in Alaska
 Green Mountain Transit, a transportation company in Vermont
 Grosmont railway station, in England

Other uses 
 GMT (TV programme), UK
 Glycine/sarcosine N-methyltransferase, an enzyme
 G:MT – Greenwich Mean Time, a 1999 British film
 GMT Games, US
 GMT Records, a Japanese record label
 Goodman–Martinez–Thompson correlation, between the Mayan and Julian calendars
 Guy McCoy Tormé, a British rock-band
 Metal-Textile Union, a former Austrian trade union